Neil Broad and Gary Muller were the defending champions, but lost in the second round to Kent Kinnear and Brad Pearce.

Grant Connell and Glenn Michibata won the title by defeating Jorge Lozano and Todd Witsken 6–3, 6–7, 6–2 in the final.

Seeds
The first four seeds received a bye to the second round.

Draw

Finals

Top half

Bottom half

References

External links
 Official results archive (ATP)
 Official results archive (ITF)

Sovran Bank Classic Doubles